Ted Sharks (born January 25) is a Japanese film director, producer, screenwriter and editor. He is best known for writing and directing Hard to Say, Save the Underprivileged and An Ideal Marriage.

Personal life 
Sharks was born in Ibaraki, Japan.  He went to Waseda University, Tokyo. He later attended Digital Hollywood School to learn CG Animation. His short CG animation film When a spoon met a knife won the award of Tsukuba Gakuin University Awards (Tsukuba Short Movie Competition).

Then he moved to New York and attended New York Film Academy. While at the school, his quarter film Hard to Say won  the award of "Best Music Video" in Metropolitan Film Festival of New York City.

Career

Director and writer 
His CG animation film When a spoon met a knife, a love story between a spoon and a knife, won the award of Tsukuba Gakuin University Awards.

After he decided to make a film, not CG animation, his quarter film Hard to Say at New York Film Academy won the Best Music Video Award in Metropolitan Film Festival of New York City. It was selected as an official screening for NYC Independent Film Festival. His late start to be a film director and an achievement appeared in Japanese newspaper Shukan NY Seikatsu."

Awards and recognition

An Ideal Marriage ( Short Film; Director, Writer and Editor ) – 2016 
WINNER “BEST SHORT FILM (Grand Prix)”  (NYC Indie Film Awards)

WINNER “BEST DIRECTOR (2nd Place )”  (NYC Indie Film Awards)

Official Selection (UAS International Action Film Festival)

Official Selection (New York Short Film Festival)

Official Selection (NYC Indie Film Awards)

Red Rose Chronicle ( Short Film; Director, Writer and Editor ) - 2016 
WINNER AWARD OF RECOGNITION (Best Shorts Competition)

WINNER AWARD OF RECOGNITION (Accolade Global Film Competition)

Tiny Snow ( Music Video; 2nd Videographer ) - 2016 
WINNER BEST MUSIC VIDEOS (New York Jazz Film Festival)

WINNER GOLDEN AGE IN JAZZ AWARD (New York Jazz Film Festival)

Hard to Say ( Music Video; Director, Cinematographer, Writer and Editor ) – 2015 
WINNER BEST MUSIC VIDEO (Metropolitan Film Festival of New York City)

Official Selection (International Film Festival Manhattan NYC)

Official Selection (NYC Independent Film Festival)

Official selection (CINEPLAY film awards)

When a spoon met a knife - 2015 
WINNER Tsukuba Gakuin University Awards (Tsukuba Short Movie Competition)

Filmography

References

External links 
 
 テッド・シャークス（日本語）

1970 births
American male film actors
American male screenwriters
American film producers
Jewish American male actors
Jewish American writers
Living people
Tisch School of the Arts alumni
20th-century American male actors
21st-century American male actors
Male actors from New York City
Film directors from New York City
Writers from New York City
Golden Globe Award-winning producers
Screenwriters from New York (state)